Tabloid journalism is a popular style of largely sensationalist journalism (usually dramatized and sometimes unverifiable or even blatantly false), which takes its name from the tabloid newspaper format: a small-sized newspaper also known as half broadsheet. The size became associated with sensationalism, and tabloid journalism replaced the earlier label of yellow journalism and scandal sheets. Not all newspapers associated with tabloid journalism are tabloid size, and not all tabloid-size newspapers engage in tabloid journalism; in particular, since around the year 2000 many broadsheet newspapers converted to the more compact tabloid format.

In some cases, celebrities have successfully sued for libel, demonstrating that tabloid stories have defamed them.

Publications engaging in tabloid journalism are known as rag newspapers or simply rags.

Tabloid journalism has changed over the last decade to more online platforms that seek to target and engage youth consumers with celebrity news and entertainment.

Scandal sheets 

Scandal sheets were the precursors to tabloid journalism. Around 1770, scandal sheets appeared in London, and in the United States as early as the 1840s. Reverend Henry Bate was the editor of one of the earliest scandal sheets, The Morning Post, which specialized in printing malicious society gossip, selling positive mentions in its pages, and collecting suppression fees to keep stories unpublished.  Other Georgian era scandal sheets were Theodore Hook's John Bull, Charles Molloy Westmacott's The Age, and Barnard Gregory's The Satirist. William d'Alton Mann, owner of the scandal sheet Town Topics, explained his purpose: "My ambition is to reform the Four Hundred by making them too deeply disgusted with themselves to continue their silly, empty way of life." Many scandal sheets in the U.S. were short-lived attempts at blackmail. One of the most popular in the States was the National Police Gazette.

Scandal sheets in the early 20th century were usually 4- or 8-page cheap papers specializing in the lurid and profane, sometimes used to grind political, ideological, or personal axes, sometimes to make money (because "scandal sells"), and sometimes for extortion. A Duluth, Minnesota example was The Rip-saw, written by a puritanical journalist named John R. Morrison who was outraged by the vice and corruption he observed in that 1920s mining town. The Rip-saw regularly published accusations of drunkenness, debauchery, and corruption against prominent citizens and public officials. Morrison was convicted of criminal libel in one instance, but his scandal sheet may have contributed to several politicians losing their elections. After Morrison published an issue claiming that State Senator Mike Boylan had threatened to kill him, Boylan responded by helping to pass the Public Nuisance Bill of 1925. It allowed a single judge, without jury, to stop a newspaper or magazine from publishing, forever. Morrison died before the new law could be used to shut down The Rip-saw. The Saturday Press was another Minnesota scandal sheet. When the Public Nuisance Bill of 1925 was used to shut down The Saturday Press, the case made its way to the United States Supreme Court which found the gag law to be unconstitutional.

Supermarket tabloids

In the United States and Canada, "supermarket tabloids" are large, national versions of these tabloids, usually published weekly. They are named for their prominent placement along the supermarket checkout lines.

In the 1960s, the National Enquirer began selling magazines in supermarkets as an alternative to newsstands. To help with their rapport with supermarkets and continue their franchise within them, they had offered to buy back unsold issues so newer, more up to date ones could be displayed.

These tabloids—such as The Globe and the National Enquirer—often use aggressive and usually mean-spirited tactics to sell their issues. Unlike regular tabloid-format newspapers, supermarket tabloids are distributed through the magazine distribution channel like other weekly magazines and mass-market paperback books. Leading examples include the National Enquirer, Star, Weekly World News (later reinvented as a parody of the style), and the Sun. Most major supermarket tabloids in the U.S. are published by American Media, Inc., including the National Enquirer, Star, The Globe, and National Examiner.

A major event in the history of U.S. supermarket tabloids was the successful libel lawsuit by Carol Burnett against the National Enquirer (Carol Burnett v. National Enquirer, Inc.), arising out of a false 1976 report in the National Enquirer, implying she was drunk and boisterous in a public encounter with U.S. Secretary of State Henry Kissinger. Though its impact is widely debated, it is generally seen as a significant turning point in the relations between celebrities and tabloid journalism, increasing the willingness of celebrities to sue for libel in the U.S., and somewhat dampening the recklessness of U.S. tabloids. Other celebrities have attempted to sue tabloid magazines for libel and slander including Phil McGraw in 2016 and Richard Simmons in 2017.

Tabloids may pay for stories.  Besides scoops meant to be headline stories, this can be used to censor stories damaging to the paper's allies.  Known as "catch and kill", tabloid newspapers may pay someone for the exclusive rights to a story, then choose not to run it.  Publisher American Media has been accused of burying stories embarrassing to Arnold Schwarzenegger, Donald Trump, and Harvey Weinstein.

Red tops
The term "red tops" refers to British tabloids with red mastheads, such as The Sun, the Daily Star, the Daily Mirror, and the Daily Record.

Modern tabloid journalism 
In the early 21st century, much of tabloid journalism and news production changed mediums to online formats. This change is to keep up with the era of digital media and allow for increased accessibility of readers. With a steady decline in paid newspapers, the gap has been filled by expected free daily articles, mostly in the tabloid format. Tabloid readers are often youths and studies show that consumers of tabloids are on average less educated. It can often depict inaccurate news and misrepresent individuals and situations.

See also

 Benji the Binman
 Broadcast syndication
 Gossip magazine
 Index of journalism articles
 Jazz journalism – US sensationalist press of the 1920s
 Leveson Inquiry
 Mediatization (media), for the social and political consequences of tabloidization
 Middle-market newspaper

References

Further reading
Bastos, M. T. (2016). Digital Journalism And Tabloid Journalism. The Routledge Companion to Digital Journalism Studies, 217–225. doi: 10.4324/9781315713793-22
 Bessie, Simon Michael. Jazz Journalism: The Story Of The Tabloid Newspapers (1938)  online
 
 Gekoski, Anna, Jacqueline M. Gray, and Joanna R. Adler. "What makes a homicide newsworthy? UK national tabloid newspaper journalists tell all." British Journal of Criminology 52.6 (2012): 1212–1232. online
 
 Johansson, Sofia. "Gossip, sport and pretty girls: What does 'trivial' journalism mean to Tabloid Newspaper readers?." Journalism Practice 2.3 (2008): 402–413.
 
 Popović, V., & Popović, P. (2014). The Twenty-First Century, the Reign of Tabloid Journalism. Procedia - Social and Behavioral Sciences, 163, 12–18. doi: 10.1016/j.sbspro.2014.12.280
 Richardson, John E., and James Stanyer. "Reader opinion in the digital age: Tabloid and broadsheet newspaper websites and the exercise of political voice." Journalism 12.8 (2011): 983–1003. onlie
  online

External links

 
News media manipulation
Media bias
Types of journalism